Amanda Marietta Ratnayake (born 1990) is a Sri Lankan businesswoman and beauty pageant titleholder who was crowned Miss Sri Lanka 2013 and represented her country at the Miss Universe 2013 pageant.

Biography
Rathnayake studied at Lyceum International School, Sri Lanka, followed by a degree in economics in America.

On 14 September 2013, Ratnayake was chosen as Miss Sri Lanka, and in November went to Moscow to compete for the crown of Miss Universe 2013 but did not place in the semifinals.

She is currently a businesswoman, who owns her own travel company. She married in 2016 after five years with her boyfriend.

References

External links
Official Miss Sri Lanka website

	

1990 births
Living people
Miss Universe 2013 contestants
Sri Lankan beauty pageant winners
People from Colombo